Millennium is a series of best-selling and award-winning Swedish crime novels, created by journalist Stieg Larsson. The two primary characters in the saga are Lisbeth Salander, an asocial computer hacker with a photographic memory, and Mikael Blomkvist, an investigative journalist and publisher of a magazine called Millennium.

Larsson planned the series as having 10 installments, but completed only three before his sudden death in 2004. All three were published posthumously by Norstedts Förlag: The Girl with the Dragon Tattoo in 2005, The Girl Who Played with Fire in 2006, and The Girl Who Kicked the Hornets' Nest in 2007. Larsson's novels were originally printed in Swedish, with English editions by Quercus in the United Kingdom and Alfred A. Knopf in the United States translated by Steven "Reg Keeland" T. Murray. The books have since been translated by many publishers in over 50 countries. By March 2015, 80 million copies of the first three books had been sold worldwide.

In 2013, Norstedts Förlag commissioned Swedish author and crime journalist David Lagercrantz to continue the Millennium series with Larsson's characters. The Girl in the Spider's Web was published in 2015, followed by The Girl Who Takes an Eye for an Eye in 2017, and The Girl Who Lived Twice in 2019. With Lagercrantz's first two installments, the Millennium series had sold over 100 million copies worldwide by May 2019, making it one of the best-selling book series in history.

In November 2021, publishing house Polaris acquired the rights to the series from Larsson's estate and announced a new trilogy of books written by Swedish author Karin Smirnoff. The Girl in the Eagle's Talons was published in 2022.

Production

Origins
After his death, many of Larsson's friends said the character of Lisbeth Salander was created out of an incident in which Larsson, then a teenager, witnessed three of his friends gang-raping an acquaintance of his named Lisbeth, and did nothing to stop it. Days later, wracked with guilt, he begged her forgiveness — which she refused. The incident, he said, haunted him for years afterward, and in part moved him to create a character with her name who was also a rape survivor. The veracity of this story has since been questioned, after a colleague from Expo magazine reported to Rolling Stone that Larsson had told him that he had heard the story secondhand and retold it as his own.

In the only interview he ever did about the series, Larsson stated that he based the character on what he imagined Pippi Longstocking might have been like as an adult. Another source of inspiration was Larsson's niece, Therese. A rebellious teenager, she often wore black clothing and makeup and told him several times that she wanted to get a tattoo of a dragon. The author often emailed Therese while writing the novels to ask her about her life and how she would react in certain situations.

Larsson's friend and colleague Kurdo Baksi believes the author was also influenced by two murders in 2001 and 2002: Melissa Nordell, a model killed by her boyfriend, and Fadime Şahindal, a Swedish-Kurdish woman killed by her father. Both women were killed at the hands of men or as victims of honor crime. To Larsson, there was no difference, and the "systematic violence" against women highly affected and inspired him to take action against these crimes through his writing. Eva Gabrielsson, Larsson's longtime partner, wrote that "the trilogy allowed Stieg to denounce everyone he loathed for their cowardice, their irresponsibility, and their opportunism: Couch potato activists, sunny-day warriors, fair-weather skippers who pick and choose their causes; false friends who used him to advance their own careers; unscrupulous company heads and shareholders who wrangle themselves huge bonuses... Seen in this light, Stieg couldn't have had any better therapy for what ailed his soul than writing his novels."

People who knew Larsson, such as Baksi and Anders Hellberg, a colleague of Larsson's in the 1970s and 1980s, were surprised that he wrote the novels. Hellberg went so far as to suspect that Larsson is not the sole author of the series, reasoning that Larsson was simply not a good enough writer. His partner Gabrielsson has been named as the most likely candidate, due to her chosen wording during at least one interview that seemed to imply co-authorship. She later claimed she had been misquoted. In 2011 Gabrielsson expressed anger at such accusations and clarified: "The actual writing, the craftsmanship, was Stieg's. But the content is a different matter. There are a lot of my thoughts, ideas and work in there." As an example she said he used her unfinished book about architect Per Olof Hallman to research locations for the Millennium series, and that the two of them physically checked places together and discussed where the characters would live.

Original trilogy by Stieg Larsson
Having begun writing the first book in summer 2002, Larsson waited until he had finished the first two and most of the third before submitting them to Swedish publishers. Baksi suggested he might have written the first chapter in 1997, which is when Larsson told him he was writing a novel. While other publishers had turned the manuscripts down, Expos publisher Robert Aschberg recommended them to Norstedts Förlag, whose editors accepted after reading the first two books in a single sitting. Norstedts commissioned Steven T. Murray to undertake the English translation. Larsson tried to get British publishers to accept his book, but was turned down until Christopher MacLehose bought the global English-language rights of the book for his MacLehose Press, an imprint of the London publisher Quercus. Both Gabrielsson and Murray have said that MacLehose "needlessly prettified" the English translation, this being the reason Murray requested he be credited under the pseudonym "Reg Keeland." MacLehose explained that the translations were commissioned by the Swedish company who adapted the books to film in order to aid an English-speaking screenwriter whom the producers were hoping to hire. For that reason they were done quickly and were not intended for publication. MacLehose said he polished and tightened them up a bit, as he would with any translation. The English releases changed the titles, even though Larsson specifically refused to allow the Swedish publisher to change the name of the first novel, and the size of Salander's dragon tattoo; from a large piece covering her entire back, to a small shoulder tattoo. Alfred A. Knopf bought the U.S. rights to the books after Larsson's death in 2004, and uses this same translation.

Follow-up trilogy by David Lagercrantz

In December 2013, the Swedish publisher Norstedts announced that a fourth Millennium book, to be published in August 2015, would be written by David Lagercrantz, a Swedish author known for being Zlatan Ibrahimović's biographer. Gabrielsson has voiced criticism against this project, which has not made use of the unpublished material which is still in her possession. The Swedish title of the book is Det som inte dödar oss, literally translated "That Which Does Not Kill Us". Like the previous novels, the English language translation was published by Quercus. The book was released with the English language title The Girl in the Spider's Web in the UK on 27 August and in the US on 1 September 2015.

The fifth book in the Millennium series was released in September 2017, once again written by Lagercrantz. The Swedish title is Mannen som sökte sin skugga (literal English translation: The Man Who Hunted his Shadow) and the English title is The Girl Who Takes an Eye for an Eye.

In 2017, Lagercrantz stated that he would only write one more installment in the Millennium series. Lagercrantz's The Girl Who Lived Twice was released on August 22, 2019.

Third trilogy by Karin Smirnoff
In November 2021, publishing house Polaris announced that they acquired the rights to the Millennium series from Larsson's estate and will release three new books in the series. Swedish author Karin Smirnoff was confirmed as the writer in December. Smirnoff said she accepted the offer without hesitation and stated "The Millennium books are classics in their genre, where the combination of unforgettable characters and the strong political and societal engagement still fascinates readers. I will continue to build on Stieg Larsson's core themes, such as violence, abuse of power, and contemporary political currents."

Smirnoff's first entry in the series, The Girl in the Eagle's Talons, was published on October 31, 2022. An English translation by Sarah Death will be published on August 29, 2023.

Novels

Written by Stieg Larsson

Written by David Lagercrantz

Written by Karin Smirnoff

Larsson's unfinished material

Larsson wrote an incomplete manuscript of another novel in the series before his sudden death in November 2004. His partner, Eva Gabrielsson, is in possession of the notebook computer with the manuscript, but does not own the rights to Larsson's work. In an attempt to protect Gabrielsson from the people he was investigating in real life. Larsson never married. He wrote a will but it was not witnessed, making it invalid according to Swedish law. Thus, it is his family who have succession. Outlines or manuscripts for a fifth and sixth book also possibly exist.

In 2010, Larsson's friend John-Henri Holmberg showed Associated Press emails he received from the author shortly before his death that supposedly described plans for another book in the series. In them Larsson wrote, "The plot is set 120 kilometres north of Sachs Harbour, at Banks Island in the month of September ... According to the synopsis it should be 440 pages."

Gabrielsson has described the manuscript in her possession as roughly 200 pages, having a working title of Guds hämnd (God's Revenge), being 30% complete and "Not worth publishing as is." In 2011 Gabrielsson said, "I once offered to finish it, but I have to have the legal rights to do so, and they didn't want to give me that, so I think we should all be happy that there are just three." Only months earlier, Larsson's former colleague Kurdo Baksi said he and the author's father were shown the manuscript by Gabrielsson shortly after Larsson's death and that "It is at 260 pages at the moment – about 70% complete." He described the manuscript as being the fifth in the series, set "between Ireland, Sweden and the US" and largely featuring Lisbeth Salander's twin sister Camilla. Baksi is also against having a ghost writer complete it, believing that they "would not respect Stieg Larsson's style."

Reception
The first novel won Sweden's Glass Key award in 2006, that same year the second book won the Best Swedish Crime Novel Award, and in 2008 the third novel also won the Glass Key award. In the 2012 revised edition of Japan's Tozai Mystery Best 100, the Millennium series was ranked the twelfth best mystery from the West. By May 2010, 27 million copies of the trilogy had been sold worldwide, a number that would grow to more than 46 million over the next five months, and reach 65 million in December 2011. In July 2010 the series made Larsson the first author to sell a million electronic copies of his work on the Amazon Kindle. Sales reached 75 million copies throughout fifty countries by December 2013, and 80 million by March 2015. Lagercrantz's first two installments had sold 14 million copies in 47 countries by May 2019, increasing the Millennium series' total to over 100 million copies worldwide.

Adaptations

Swedish films

 The Girl with the Dragon Tattoo, released on February 25, 2009.
 The Girl Who Played with Fire, released on September 18, 2009.
 The Girl Who Kicked the Hornets' Nest, released on November 27, 2009.

The Swedish film production company Yellow Bird has produced film versions of the Millennium Trilogy, co-produced with The Danish film production company Nordisk Film and television company, which were released in Scandinavia in 2009. In 2010, the extending of all three films to approximately 180 minutes led to their being shown on Swedish television as the six-part Millennium series. Each film was divided into two parts of 90 minutes. This version was released on July 14, 2010, on DVD and Blu-ray Disc in three separate sets and on November 24, 2010, as a Complete Millennium Trilogy box set with an extra disc.

Originally, only the first film was meant for a theatrical release, with the following ones conceived as TV films, but this was changed in the wake of the tremendous success of the first film. The first film was directed by Niels Arden Oplev and the next two by Daniel Alfredson, while the screenplays of the first two were adapted by Nikolaj Arcel and Rasmus Heisterberg, and the last one by Ulf Rydberg and Jonas Frykberg. All three films feature Michael Nyqvist as Mikael Blomkvist and Noomi Rapace as Lisbeth Salander.

American films

 The Girl with the Dragon Tattoo.  Released in North America on December 21, 2011, and in the United Kingdom on December 26, 2011.
The Girl in the Spider's Web. Released in Sweden on October 26, 2018, and in the United States on November 9, 2018.

Yellow Bird and Metro-Goldwyn-Mayer partnered with Columbia Pictures to produce an English-language adaptation of the first novel. The Girl with the Dragon Tattoo was written by Steven Zaillian, directed by David Fincher and produced by Scott Rudin, with Daniel Craig as Mikael Blomkvist and Rooney Mara as Lisbeth Salander. Along with Dragon Tattoo, Fincher and Zaillian signed a two-picture deal to adapt The Girl Who Played with Fire, and The Girl Who Kicked the Hornets' Nest, which would possibly have been shot back to back. In January 2012, it was announced that Sony was "moving forward" with the adaptations of The Girl Who Played with Fire and The Girl Who Kicked the Hornet's Nest. Zaillian wrote the original screenplays, but Sony brought in Andrew Kevin Walker to revise them. The studio had hoped to have the same people involved in the sequels as in the first film, with Fincher directing and Daniel Craig and Rooney Mara starring, but scheduling has been difficult.

On 4 November 2015, it was announced that an adaptation of The Girl in the Spider's Web was in the works and that Craig and Mara would not be reprising their roles. The film is a quasi-reboot featuring a different cast, but still framed as a sequel to Fincher's film. It is directed by Fede Álvarez, and stars Claire Foy as Salander and Sverrir Gudnason as Blomkvist.

Comics
In October 2011, DC Comics announced that its Vertigo imprint had acquired the rights to the series, and would be adapting each novel into two graphic novels. The adaptations were written by Scottish crime novelist Denise Mina, with art by Leonardo Manco and Andrea Mutti.

 The Girl with the Dragon Tattoo, Book 1, released on November 13, 2012.
 The Girl with the Dragon Tattoo, Book 2, released on May 7, 2013.
 The Girl Who Played with Fire, released on June 3, 2014.
 The Girl Who Kicked the Hornet's Nest, released on July 28, 2015.

For the Franco-Belgian market, a separate adaptation has been published, written by Sylvain Runberg with artwork by José Homs and Manolo Carot. Starting in 2016, Runberg followed up the series with newer stories based on the characters, Millénium Saga, independent of David Lagercrantz' sequels.

In 2017, Titan Comics began publishing English translations of the Runberg/Homs adaptations under their Hard Case Crime imprint.

Legacy 
The Stockholm City Museum hosts a two hour long tour of the city with popular spots that Larsson visited and other spots named as being visited by his characters Lisbeth Salander and Mikael Blomkvist.

See also

References

External links

 The Stieg Larsson Trilogy from UK publisher Quercus
 The official Millennium site from Swedish publisher Norstedts Förlag
 The official Millennium site from Swedish publisher Polaris

 
Novel series
Novels set in Sweden
Book series introduced in 2005
Works about computer hacking